The Pal/ Paluh/ Palh (Sindhi: پلهہ) is a Sammat tribe of Sindh province, Pakistan. parts of Punjab bordering Sindh, in Balochistan province, and in the Rajasthan of India. 
 
There is  a railway station in Sindh Hyderabad Badin line also on the name of Palh, Palh railway station

There are villages by the name of Palh in Badin, Dadu, Khairpur and Sukkur Districts,

Distribution
Most of this tribe live mainly in the Miranpur, Sindh, Padidan and Dariya Khan Marri areas of Naushahro Feroze District, Village Palh, and Dadu areas of Dadu District, Jam Sahib in Shaheed Benazirabad District, Ranipur, Sindh, Kunmb, Kandir and Palh village in Khairpur District. However some families are settled in the cities of Larkana, Sukkur, Hyderabad, Karachi, Multan, Quetta and Islamabad The total population of Palh tribe is around 23,000.

The head of this tribe is called Sardar and current head of Palh tribe is Haji Arbab Ali Khan Palh.

Notable people
Haji Idrees Palh (Social Activist).

Haji Khan Palh

Muhammad Qabool Palh

Muhammad Noah Palh

References

Sindhi tribes
Sindhi names
Sindhi-language surnames